 
This is a list of municipalities in Japan which have standing links to local communities in other countries. In most cases, the association, especially when formalised by local government, is known as "town twinning" (usually in Europe) or "sister cities" (usually in the rest of the world).

For twinning between Japanese and Chinese municipalities the term "friendship cities" is used, due to problematic translation (the term "sister cities" requires specification of which of the cities is the younger sister and which is the older one).

A
Ageo
 Lockyer Valley, Australia

Akabira

 Kaga, Japan
 Samcheok, South Korea
 Yueyang, China

Akashi

 Vallejo, United States
 Wuxi, China

Akita

 Hitachiōta, Japan
 Kenai, United States
 Lanzhou, China
 Passau, Germany
 St. Cloud, United States
 Vladivostok, Russia

Akkeshi
 Clarence, Australia

Amagasaki
 Augsburg, Germany

Anjō

 Hobsons Bay, Australia
 Huntington Beach, United States
 Kolding, Denmark

Aomori

 Kecskemét, Hungary
 Pyeongtaek, South Korea

Aridagawa

 Guixi, China
 Palmerston, Australia

Arita

 Jingdezhen, China
 Meissen, Germany

Asago

 Newberg, United States
 Perth, Canada

Asahikawa

 Bloomington, United States
 Harbin, China
 Minamisatsuma, Japan
 Normal, United States
 Suwon, South Korea

Asakuchi

 Gao'an, China
 Tea Tree Gully, Australia

Ashikaga

 Kamakura, Japan
 Jining, China
 Springfield, United States

Ashiya
 Montebello, United States

Atami

 Beppu, Japan
 Cascais, Portugal
 Sanremo, Italy
 Zhuhai, China

Atsugi

 Gunpo, South Korea
 New Britain, United States
 Yangzhou, China

Ayabe

 Changshu, China
 Jerusalem, Israel

B
Beppu

 Bath, England, United Kingdom
 Mokpo, South Korea
 Rotorua Lakes, New Zealand
 Yantai, China

C
Chiba

 Asunción, Paraguay
 Houston, United States

 North Vancouver, Canada
 Quezon City, Philippines
 Tianjin, China
 Wujiang (Suzhou), China

Chichibu

 Antioch, United States
 Gangneung, South Korea
 Linfen, China
 Warringah (Northern Beaches), Australia
 Yasothon, Thailand

Chigasaki
 Honolulu, United States

Chitose

 Anchorage, United States
 Ibusuki, Japan
 Kongsberg, Norway

D
Daisen

 Temecula, United States
 Yangyang, South Korea

Dazaifu
 Buyeo, South Korea

E
Ebetsu
 Gresham, United States

Esashi
 Sollefteå, Sweden

F
Fuji

 Jiaxing, China
 Oceanside, United States

Fujieda

 Penrith, Australia
 Yangju, South Korea

Fujikawaguchiko
 Zermatt, Switzerland

Fujimi
 Šabac, Serbia

Fujinomiya

 Ōmihachiman, Japan
 Santa Monica, United States
 Shaoxing, China
 Yeongju, South Korea

Fujisawa

 Boryeong, South Korea
 Kunming, China
 Matsumoto, Japan
 Miami Beach, United States
 Windsor, Canada

Fujiyoshida

 Chamonix-Mont-Blanc, France
 Colorado Springs, United States

Fukaya

 Fremont, United States
 Shunyi (Beijing), China

Fukui

 Fullerton, United States
 Hangzhou, China
 Kumamoto, Japan
 New Brunswick, United States

Fukuoka

 Atlanta, United States
 Auckland, New Zealand
 Bordeaux, France
 Busan, South Korea
 Guangzhou, China
 Ipoh, Malaysia
 Oakland, United States

Fukuroi
 Hillsboro, United States

Fukuyama

 Hamilton, Canada
 Maui County, United States
 Okazaki, Japan
 Pohang, South Korea
 Tacloban, Philippines

Funabashi

 Hayward, United States
 Odense, Denmark
 Xi'an, China

Furano

 Nishiwaki, Japan
 Schladming, Austria

G
Gifu

 Campinas, Brazil
 Cincinnati, United States

 Hangzhou, China
 Meidling (Vienna), Austria
 Thunder Bay, Canada

Gotemba

 Beaverton, United States
 Chambersburg, United States

H

Ha
Habikino
 Hietzing (Vienna), Austria

Hachinohe
 Federal Way, United States

Hachiōji

 Kaohsiung, Taiwan
 Nikkō, Japan
 Odawara, Japan
 Siheung, South Korea
 Tai'an, China
 Tomakomai, Japan
 Wriezen, Germany
 Yorii, Japan

Hadano

 Paju, South Korea
 Pasadena, United States

Hagi

 Deokjin (Yeongam), South Korea
 Kamakura, Japan
 Shimoda, Japan
 Ühlingen-Birkendorf, Germany
 Ulsan, South Korea
 Wajima, Japan

Hakodate

 Goyang, South Korea
 Halifax, Canada
 Lake Macquarie, Australia
 Vladivostok, Russia
 Yuzhno-Sakhalinsk, Russia

Hakone

 Jasper, Canada
 Taupo, New Zealand

Hamamatsu

 Camas, United States
 Chehalis, United States
 Hangzhou, China
 Porterville, United States
 Rochester, United States

Hanamaki

 Berndorf, Austria
 Hot Springs, United States
 Rutland, United States

Handa

 Midland, United States
 Port Macquarie-Hastings, Australia
 Xuzhou, China

Hannō
 Brea, United States

Hanyū

 Baguio, Philippines
 Durbuy, Belgium

Hatsukaichi
 Masterton, New Zealand

Hayama

 Holdfast Bay, Australia
 Kusatsu, Gunma, Japan

He–Hi
Hekinan

 Edmonds, United States
 Pula, Croatia
 Yuni, Japan

Hidaka
 Osan, South Korea

Higashihiroshima

 Deyang, China
 Kitahiroshima, Japan
 Marília, Brazil

Higashikawa

 Canmore, Canada
 Rūjiena, Latvia

Higashimurayama

 Independence, United States
 Kashiwazaki, Japan

Higashiōmi

 Jangam-myeon (Buyeo), South Korea
 Marquette, United States
 Rättvik, Sweden
 Taber, Canada

Higashiōsaka

 Glendale, United States
 Mitte (Berlin), Germany

Hikone
 Ann Arbor, United States

Himeji

 Adelaide, Australia
 Changwon, South Korea
 Charleroi, Belgium
 Curitiba, Brazil
 Matsumoto, Japan
 Phoenix, United States
 Taiyuan, China
 Tottori, Japan

Hino

 Redlands, United States
 Shiwa, Japan

Hirakata

 Changning (Shanghai), China
 Logan, Australia
 Yeongam, South Korea

Hiratsuka
 Lawrence, United States

Hiroshima

 Chongqing, China
 Daegu, South Korea
 Hanover, Germany
 Honolulu, United States
 Montreal, Canada
 Volgograd, Russia

Hitachi

 Birmingham, United States
 Kiryū, Japan
 Tauranga, New Zealand

I

Ib–In
Ibaraki

 Anqing, China
 Minneapolis, United States
 Shōdoshima, Japan

Ichihara
 Mobile, United States

Ichinoseki
 Central Highlands, Australia

Ichikawa

 Gardena, United States
 Issy-les-Moulineaux, France
 Leshan, China
 Medan, Indonesia
 Rosenheim, Germany

Iizuka
 Sunnyvale, United States

Ikata
 Red Wing, United States

Ikeda

 Launceston, Australia
 Suzhou, China

Imabari

 Lakeland, United States
 Onomichi, Japan
 Ōta, Japan
 Panama City, Panama

Inashiki
 Salmon Arm, Canada

Inazawa
 Olympia, Greece

Inuyama

 Davis, United States
 Haman, South Korea
 Nichinan, Japan
 Sankt Goarshausen, Germany
 Tateyama, Japan
 Xiangyang, China

Ir–It
Iruma

 Fenghua (Ningbo), China
 Sado, Japan
 Wolfratshausen, Germany

Isahaya

 Athens, United States
 Zhangzhou, China

Isehara
 La Mirada, United States

Isesaki

 Ma'anshan, China
 Springfield, United States

Ishikari

 Campbell River, Canada
 Pengzhou, China
 Vanino, Russia

Ishinomaki

 Hitachinaka, Japan
 Wenzhou, China

Itami

 Foshan, China
 Hasselt, Belgium
 Ōmura, Japan

Itō

 Ismayilli, Azerbaijan
 Medway, England, United Kingdom
 Rieti, Italy
 Suwa, Japan

Itoshima

 Escondido, United States

 Qingpu (Shanghai), China

Iw–Iz
Iwaki

 Kauai County, United States
 Nobeoka, Japan
 Townsville, Australia
 Yurihonjō, Japan

Iwakuni

 Everett, United States
 Jundiaí, Brazil
 Tottori, Japan

Iwanuma

 Nankoku, Japan
 Napa, United States

Iwata

 Dagupan, Philippines
 Mountain View, United States

Izu

 Hope, Canada
 Nelson, Canada

Izumi, Kagoshima

 Puli, Taiwan
 Suncheon, South Korea

Izumi, Osaka
 Bloomington, United States

Izumo

 Kalajoki, Finland
 Santa Clara, United States

J
Jōetsu

 Ena, Japan
 Hokuto, Japan
 Hunchun, China
 Itakura, Japan
 Iwanai, Japan
 Lilienfeld, Austria
 Muroran, Japan
 Pohang, South Korea
 Shizuoka, Japan
 Ueda, Japan
 Yonezawa, Japan

Jōyō

 Gyeongsan, South Korea
 Vancouver, United States

K

Ka
Kadoma

 Eindhoven, Netherlands
 Kami, Japan
 São José dos Campos, Brazil

Kagoshima

 Changsha, China
 Miami, United States
 Naples, Italy
 Perth, Australia
 Tsuruoka, Japan

Kahoku
 Meßkirch, Germany

Kakamigahara
 Chuncheon, South Korea

Kakegawa

 Corning, United States
 Eugene, United States
 Hoengseong, South Korea
 Ōshū, Japan
 Pesaro, Italy

Kakogawa

 Auckland, New Zealand
 Guilin, China
 Maringá, Brazil

Kamagaya
 Whakatāne, New Zealand

Kamakura

 Ashikaga, Japan
 Dunhuang, China
 Hagi, Japan
 Nice, France
 Ueda, Japan

Kameoka

 Jandira, Brazil
 Knittelfeld, Germany
 Stillwater, United States

Kamo

 Komsomolsk-on-Amur, Russia
 Zibo, China

Kamogawa

 Manitowoc, United States
 Minobu, Japan

Kanazawa

 Buffalo, United States
 Ghent, Belgium
 Irkutsk, Russia
 Jeonju, South Korea
 Nancy, France
 Porto Alegre, Brazil
 Suzhou, China

Kannami
 Kerman, United States

Karatsu

 Yangzhou, China
 Yeosu, South Korea

Kariya
 Mississauga, Canada

Kashiwa

 Ayase, Japan
 Camden, Australia
 Chengde, China
 Guam, United States
 Torrance, United States

Kashiwara

 Grosseto, Italy
 Xinxiang, China

Kasugai
 Kelowna, Canada

Kasukabe

 Fraser Coast, Australia
 Pasadena, United States

Katano
 Collingwood, Canada

Katō

 Chelan, United States
 Hollister, United States
 Olympia, United States

Kawachinagano
 Carmel, United States

Kawagoe

 Autun, France
 Nakasatsunai, Japan
 Obama, Japan
 Offenbach am Main, Germany
 Salem, United States
 Tanagura, Japan

Kawasaki

 Baltimore, United States
 Rijeka, Croatia
 Shenyang, China
 Wollongong, Australia

Ki
Kinokawa

 Binzhou, China
 Seogwipo, South Korea

Kirishima

 Liuyang, China
 Sonora, United States
 Yaozhou (Tongchuan), China

Kiryū

 Biella, Italy
 Columbus, United States
 Hitachi, Japan
 Naruto, Japan

Kisarazu
 Oceanside, United States

Kishiwada

 Shantou, China
 South San Francisco, United States
 Yeongdeungpo (Seoul), South Korea

Kitakami

 Concord, United States
 Sanmenxia, China
 Shibata, Japan

Kitakyushu

 Dalian, China
 Haiphong, Vietnam
 Incheon, South Korea
 Norfolk, United States
 Phnom Penh, Cambodia
 Tacoma, United States

Kitami

 Barrhead, Canada
 Elizabeth, United States
 Jinju, South Korea
 Kōchi, Japan
 Marumori, Japan
 Sakawa, Japan

Kiyosu
 Jerez de la Frontera, Spain

Kizugawa
 Santa Monica, United States

Ko
Kobe

 Barcelona, Spain
 Brisbane, Australia
 Incheon, South Korea
 Marseille, France
 Riga, Latvia
 Rio de Janeiro, Brazil
 Seattle, United States
 Tianjin, China

Kōchi

 Fresno, United States
 Kitami, Japan
 Surabaya, Indonesia
 Wuhu, China

Kōfu

 Chengdu, China
 Des Moines, United States
 Lodi, United States
 Pau, France
 Yamatokōriyama, Japan

Kōka

 DeWitt, United States
 Icheon, South Korea
 Marshall, United States
 Traverse City, United States

Kokubunji

 Sado, Japan
 Marion, Australia

Komaki

 Anyang, South Korea
 Wyandotte, United States

Komatsu

 Gateshead, England, United Kingdom
 Jining, China
 Suzano, Brazil
 Vilvoorde, Belgium

Kosai
 Greater Geraldton, Australia

Koshigaya
 Campbelltown, Australia

Ku–Ky
Kuji

 Franklin, United States
 Klaipėda, Lithuania

Kuki
 Roseburg, United States

Kumagaya
 Invercargill, New Zealand

Kumamoto

 Fukui, Japan
 Guilin, China
 Heidelberg, Germany
 San Antonio, United States

Kurashiki

 Christchurch, New Zealand
 Kansas City, United States
 Sankt Pölten, Austria
 Zhenjiang, China

Kure

 Bremerton, United States
 Changwon, South Korea
 Keelung, Taiwan
 Marbella, Spain
 Wenzhou, China

Kurume

 Hefei, China
 Modesto, United States

Kusatsu, Gunma

 Bietigheim-Bissingen, Germany
 Hayama, Japan
 Karlovy Vary, Czech Republic
 Neustift im Stubaital, Austria
 Snowy Monaro, Australia

Kusatsu, Shiga

 Kan'onji, Japan
 Pontiac, United States

Kushimoto

 Hemet, United States
 Mersin, Turkey
 Torres, Australia
 Yakakent, Turkey

Kushiro

 Burnaby, Canada
 Kholmsk, Russia
 Petropavlovsk-Kamchatsky, Russia 
 Tottori, Japan
 Yuzawa, Japan

Kyōtamba
 Hawkesbury, Australia

Kyōtango
 Bozhou, China

Kyoto

 Boston, United States
 Cologne, Germany
 Florence, Italy
 Guadalajara, Mexico
 Kyiv, Ukraine

 Prague, Czech Republic
 Xi'an, China
 Zagreb, Croatia

M

Ma
Maebashi
 Birmingham, United States

Maizuru

 Dalian, China
 Nakhodka, Russia
 Portsmouth, England, United Kingdom

Marugame

 Kyōgoku, Japan
 San Sebastián, Spain
 Zhangjiagang, China

Matsudo
 Whitehorse, Australia

Matsue

 Jilin City, China
 New Orleans, United States
 Ōguchi, Japan
 Onomichi, Japan
 Suzu, Japan
 Takarazuka, Japan
 Yinchuan, China

Matsumoto

 Fujisawa, Japan
 Grindelwald, Switzerland
 Himeji, Japan
 Kathmandu, Nepal
 Langfang, China
 Salt Lake City, United States
 Takayama, Japan

Matsusaka
 Binhu (Wuxi), China

Matsuura
 Mackay, Australia

Matsuyama

 Freiburg im Breisgau, Germany
 Sacramento, United States

Mi
Miharu
 Rice Lake, United States

Miki

 Federation, Australia
 Visalia, United States

Minamata
 Devonport, Australia

Minamiashigara
 Tilburg, Netherlands

Minamiuonuma

 Ashburton, New Zealand
 Lillehammer, Norway
 Sölden, Austria

Minami-Alps

 Anamizu, Japan
 Dujiangyan, China
 Marshalltown, United States
 Ogasawara, Japan
 Tsubetsu, Japan
 Winterset, United States

Minoh

 Cuernavaca, Mexico
 Hutt, New Zealand

Minokamo
 Dubbo, Australia

Mishima

 Lishui, China
 New Plymouth, New Zealand
 Pasadena, United States

Mito
 Anaheim, United States

Miura

 Suzaka, Japan
 Warrnambool, Australia

Miyazaki

 Boeun, South Korea
 Kashihara, Japan
 Huludao, China
 Virginia Beach, United States
 Waukegan, United States

Miyazu

 Delray Beach, United States
 Nelson, New Zealand
 Qinhuangdao, China

Miyoshi, Saitama
 Petaling Jaya, Malaysia

Miyoshi, Tokushima

 The Dalles, United States
 Tukwila, United States

Mo–My
Mobara
 Salisbury, Australia

Monbetsu

 Fairbanks, United States
 Korsakov, Russia
 Newport, United States

Moriguchi
 New Westminster, Canada

Morioka
 Victoria, Canada

Mukō

 Saratoga, United States

Munakata
 Gimhae, South Korea

Murayama
 Yakutsk, Russia

Muroran

 Jōetsu, Japan
 Knoxville, United States
 Shizuoka, Japan

Myōkō

 Schruns, Austria
 Slovenj Gradec, Slovenia
 Tschagguns, Austria
 Zermatt, Switzerland

N

Na
Nagahama

 Augsburg, Germany
 Verona, Italy

Nagaizumi
 Whanganui, New Zealand

Nagakute
 Waterloo, Belgium

Nagano

 Clearwater, United States
 Shijiazhuang, China

Nagaoka

 Fort Worth, United States
 Honolulu, United States
 Romainmôtier-Envy, Switzerland
 Taiarapu-Ouest, French Polynesia
 Trier, Germany

Nagaokakyō

 Arlington, United States
 Ningbo, China

Nagasaki

 Fuzhou, China
 Leiden, Netherlands
 Porto, Portugal
 Saint Paul, United States
 Santos, Brazil
 Vaux-sur-Aure, France

Nagato
 Sochi, Russia

Nagoya

 Los Angeles, United States
 Mexico City, Mexico 

 Reims, France
 Sydney, Australia
 Turin, Italy

Naha

 Fuzhou, China
 Honolulu, United States
 Nichinan, Japan
 São Vicente, Brazil

Nanao

 Bratsk, Russia
 Gimcheon, South Korea
 Jinzhou (Dalian), China
 Monterey, United States
 Morgantown, United States

Nantan

 Clutha, New Zealand
 Manila, Philippines

Nara

 Canberra, Australia
 Gyeongju, South Korea
 Kōriyama, Japan
 Obama, Japan
 Toledo, Spain
 Versailles, France
 Xi'an, China
 Yangzhou, China

Narashino
 Tuscaloosa, United States

Narita

 Foxton (Horowhenua), New Zealand
 San Bruno, United States
 Taoyuan, Taiwan
 Xianyang, China

Naruto

 Kiryū, Japan
 Lüneburg, Germany

Nasushiobara

 Hitachinaka, Japan
 Linz, Austria
 Namerikawa, Japan
 Niiza, Japan

Natori

 Guararapes, Brazil
 Kaminoyama, Japan
 Shingū, Japan

Ne–Nu
Neyagawa

 Newport News, United States
 Oakville, Canada

Nichinan

 Albany, Australia
 Inuyama, Japan
 Naha, Japan
 Portsmouth, United States

Niigata

 Birobidzhan, Russia
 Galveston, United States
 Harbin, China
 Khabarovsk, Russia
 Kingston upon Hull, England, United Kingdom
 Nantes, France

 Vladivostok, Russia

Niihama
 Dezhou, China

Niiza

 Jiyuan, China
 Jyväskylä, Finland
 Nasushiobara, Japan
 Neuruppin, Germany
 Tōkamachi, Japan

Nikkō

 Hachiōji, Japan
 Odawara, Japan
 Rapid City, United States
 Tomakomai, Japan

Nishinomiya

 Shaoxing, China
 Spokane, United States

Nishinoomote

 Isa, Japan
 Vila do Bispo, Portugal

Nishio
 Porirua, New Zealand

Nobeoka

 Iwaki, Japan
 Jinzhou (Dalian), China
 Medford, United States
 Sakai, Japan

Nosegawa
 Vysoké Tatry, Slovakia

Numazu

 Kalamazoo, United States
 Yueyang, China

O

Ob–Oi
Obama

 Gyeongju, South Korea
 Kawagoe, Japan
 Nara, Japan

Obihiro

 Chaoyang, China
 Madison, United States
 Seward, United States

Ōbu
 Port Phillip, Australia

Ōda
 Daejeon, South Korea

Odawara

 Chula Vista, United States
 Hachiōji, Japan
 Nikkō, Japan
 Yorii, Japan

Ōgaki

 Glen Eira, Australia
 Hioki, Japan

Ōiso

 Dayton, United States
 Racine, United States

Ōita

 Austin, United States
 Aveiro, Portugal
 Wuhan, China

Ok–Om
Okaya
 Mount Pleasant, United States

Okayama

 Guam, United States
 Hsinchu, Taiwan
 Luoyang, China
 Plovdiv, Bulgaria
 San José, Costa Rica
 San Jose, United States

Okazaki

 Newport Beach, United States
 Uddevalla, Sweden

Okinawa

 Lakewood, United States

 Tōkai, Japan
 Toyonaka, Japan
 Yonezawa, Japan

Okinoshima
 Krotoszyn, Poland

Omaezaki
 Uljin, South Korea

Ōmihachiman

 Fujinomiya, Japan
 Grand Rapids, United States
 Kaminokuni, Japan
 Leavenworth, United States
 Mantua, Italy
 Matsumae, Japan
 Miryang, South Korea

Ōmura

 Itami, Japan
 San Carlos, United States
 Semboku, Japan
 Sintra, Portugal

Ōmuta

 Datong, China
 Muskegon, United States

On–Oy
Ono
 Lindsay, United States

Osaka

 Chicago, United States
 Hamburg, Germany
 Melbourne, Australia
 Milan, Italy
 Saint Petersburg, Russia
 São Paulo, Brazil
 Shanghai, China

Ōsaki

 Dublin, United States
 Jinshui (Zhengzhou), China
 Middletown, United States
 Taitō (Tokyo), Japan
 Tōbetsu, Japan
 Uwajima, Japan

Ōshima
 Hawaii County, United States

Ōshū

 Breitenwang, Austria
 Greater Shepparton, Australia
 Kakegawa, Japan
 Reutte, Austria

Ōta

 Burbank, United States
 Imabari, Japan
 Lafayette, United States
 Tippecanoe County, United States
 West Lafayette, United States

Otaru

 Dunedin, New Zealand
 Gangseo (Seoul), South Korea
 Nakhodka, Russia

Ōtsu

 Gumi, South Korea
 Interlaken, Switzerland
 Lansing, United States
 Mudanjiang, China
 Würzburg, Germany

Oyama
 Mission, Canada

R
Rankoshi
 Saalfelden am Steinernen Meer, Austria

Rikuzentakata
 Crescent City, United States

Rumoi
 Ulan-Ude, Russia

S

Sa
Saga

 Cussac-Fort-Médoc, France
 Glens Falls, United States
 Lianyungang, China
 Warren County, United States
 Yeonje (Busan), South Korea

Sagae

 Andong, South Korea
 Giresun, Turkey
 Samukawa, Japan

Sagamihara

 Wuxi, China

Saijō

 Baoding, China
 Seeboden am Millstätter See, Austria

Saiki

 Gladstone, Australia
 Handan, China

Saitama

 Hamilton, New Zealand
 Nanaimo, Canada
 Pittsburgh, United States
 Richmond, United States
 Toluca, Mexico
 Zhengzhou, China

Sakado
 Dothan, United States

Sakai

 Berkeley, United States
 Lianyungang, China
 Wellington, New Zealand

Saku

 Avallon, France
 Saku, Estonia

Sakurai
 Chartres, France

Sanda

 Blue Mountains, Australia
 Jeju City, South Korea
 Kittitas County, United States

Sano

 Lancaster, United States
 Quzhou, China

Sanuki
 Eisenstadt, Austria

Sapporo

 Daejeon, South Korea
 Munich, Germany
 Novosibirsk, Russia
 Portland, United States
 Shenyang, China

Sasebo

 Albuquerque, United States
 Coffs Harbour, Australia
 Kokonoe, Japan
 Paju, South Korea
 Xiamen, China

Satsumasendai
 Changshu, China

Sayama

 Tongyeong, South Korea
 Worthington, United States

Se
Seika
 Norman, United States

Seki

 Himi, Japan
 Huangshi, China
 Mogi das Cruzes, Brazil

Sendai

 Acapulco, Mexico
 Changchun, China
 Dallas, United States
 Gwangju, South Korea
 Minsk, Belarus
 Rennes, France
 Riverside, United States

Seto

 Icheon, South Korea
 Jingdezhen, China
 Limoges, France
 Nabeul, Tunisia

Setouchi

 Horokanai, Japan
 Mytilene, Greece
 Tsushima, Japan

Settsu

 Bengbu, China
 Bundaberg, Australia

Sh
Shibata

 Orange City, United States
 St. James, United States
 Suzaka, Japan

Shibukawa

 Abano Terme, Italy
 Foligno, Italy
 Hawaii County, United States

Shijōnawate
 Meerbusch, Germany

Shikokuchūō
 Xuancheng, China

Shimada

 Brienz, Switzerland
 Huzhou, China
 Richmond, United States

Shimizu
 Squamish, Canada

Shimoda

 Hagi, Japan
 Newport, United States
 Numata, Japan

Shimonoseki

 Busan, South Korea
 Istanbul, Turkey
 Pittsburg, United States
 Qingdao, China
 Santos, Brazil

Shirakawa
 Compiègne, France

Shizuoka

 Cannes, France
 Jōetsu, Japan
 Muroran, Japan
 Omaha, United States
 Shelbyville, United States
 Stockton, United States

Shūnan

 Delfzijl, Netherlands
 São Bernardo do Campo, Brazil
 Townsville, Australia

So–Su
Sodegaura
 Itajaí, Brazil

Sōka

 Anyang, China
 Carson, United States

Sugito
 Busselton, Australia

Suita

 Canterbury-Bankstown, Australia
 Moratuwa, Sri Lanka

Sumoto

 Hawaii County, United States
 Kronstadt, Russia
 Van Wert, United States

Susono
 Frankston, Australia

Suzaka

 Miura, Japan
 Shibata, Japan
 Siping, China

Suzuka

 Bellefontaine, United States
 Le Mans, France

T

Ta–Te
Takamatsu

 Nanchang, China
 St. Petersburg, United States
 Tours, France

Takarazuka

 Alsergrund (Vienna), Austria
 Augusta, United States
 Matsue, Japan

Takasaki

 Battle Creek, United States
 Muntinlupa, Philippines
 Plzeň, Czech Republic
 Santo André, Brazil

Takatsuki

 Changzhou, China
 Masuda, Japan
 Manila, Philippines
 Toowoomba, Australia
 Wakasa, Japan

Takayama

 Denver, United States
 Kunming, China
 Lijiang, China
 Matsumoto, Japan

Tamba-Sasayama
 Walla Walla, United States

Tamano

 Gloucester, United States
 Jiujiang, China
 Tongyeong, South Korea

Tatebayashi

 Kunshan, China
 Sunshine Coast, Australia

Tateyama

 Bellingham, United States
 Port Stephens, Australia

Tendō

 Marlborough, New Zealand
 Marostica, Italy
 Wafangdian, China

To
Tōbetsu

 Date, Japan
 Leksand, Sweden
 Ōsaki, Japan

Tochigi

 Evansville, United States
 Jinhua, China

Toda

 Kaifeng, China
 Liverpool, Australia

Tōkai

 Kamaishi, Japan
 Macedon Ranges, Australia
 Nilüfer, Turkey
 Okinawa, Japan
 Yonezawa, Japan

Tōkamachi

 Como, Italy
 Niiza, Japan

Toki
 Faenza, Italy

Tokorozawa

 Anyang, South Korea
 Changzhou, China
 Decatur, United States

Tokushima

 Leiria, Portugal
 Saginaw, United States

Tokyo

 Beijing, China
 Berlin, Germany
 Cairo, Egypt
 Jakarta, Indonesia
 London, England, United Kingdom
 Moscow, Russia
 New South Wales, Australia
 New York City, United States

 São Paulo State, Brazil
 Seoul, South Korea

Tokyo – Adachi

 Belmont, Australia
 Kanuma, Japan
 Uonuma, Japan
 Yamanouchi, Japan

Tokyo – Arakawa

 Donaustadt (Vienna), Austria

 Zhongshan (Dalian), China

Tokyo – Bunkyō

 Beyoğlu, Turkey
 Kaiserslautern, Germany

Tokyo – Chūō
 Sutherland, Australia

Tokyo – Edogawa
 Central Coast, Australia

Tokyo – Itabashi
 Burlington, Canada

Tokyo – Katsushika

 Fengtai (Beijing), China
 Floridsdorf (Vienna), Austria
 Mapo (Seoul), South Korea

Tokyo – Kōtō
 Surrey, Canada

Tokyo – Meguro

 Dongcheng (Beijing), China
 Jungnang (Seoul), South Korea

Tokyo – Nerima

 Haidian (Beijing), China
 Ipswich, Australia

Tokyo – Ōta

 Chaoyang (Beijing), China
 Salem, United States

Tokyo – Setagaya

 Bunbury, Australia
 Döbling (Vienna), Austria
 Winnipeg, Canada

Tokyo – Shibuya
 Üsküdar, Turkey

Tokyo – Shinagawa
 Portland, United States

Tokyo – Shinjuku

 Dongcheng (Beijing), China
 Ina, Japan
 Lefkada, Greece
 Mitte (Berlin), Germany

Tokyo – Suginami

 Seocho (Seoul), South Korea

 Willoughby, Australia

Tokyo – Taitō

 Gladsaxe, Denmark
 Innere Stadt (Vienna), Austria
 Northern Beaches, Australia
 Ōsaki, Japan

Tomakomai

 Hachiōji, Japan
 Napier, New Zealand
 Nikkō, Japan

Tome

 Nyūzen, Japan
 Southlake, United States
 Vernon, Canada

Tonami

 Lisse, Netherlands
 Panjin, China
 Yalova, Turkey

Tosu
 Zeitz, Germany

Tottori

 Cheongju, South Korea
 Hanau, Germany
 Himeji, Japan
 Iwakuni, Japan
 Kōriyama, Japan
 Kushiro, Japan

Toyama

 Dubbo, Australia
 Durham, United States
 Mogi das Cruzes, Brazil

Toyohashi

 Panevėžys, Lithuania
 Toledo, United States

Toyokawa

 Cupertino, United States
 Xinwu (Wuxi), China

Toyonaka

 Okinawa, Japan
 San Mateo, United States

Toyota

 Derbyshire, England, United Kingdom
 Detroit, United States
 South Derbyshire, England, United Kingdom

Ts
Tsu

 Osasco, Brazil
 Zhenjiang, China

Tsubame

 Dundee, United States
 Sheboygan, United States

Tsuchiura
 Palo Alto, United States

Tsukuba

 Bochum, Germany
 Cambridge, United States
 Grenoble, France
 Irvine, United States
 Milpitas, United States
 Shenzhen, China

Tsuruga

 Donghae, South Korea
 Nakhodka, Russia
 Taizhou, China

Tsushima
 Hercules, United States

Tsuyama

 Miyakojima, Japan
 Santa Fe, United States

U
Ube

 Castellón de la Plana, Spain
 Newcastle, Australia
 Weihai, China

Uchiko

 Rothenburg ob der Tauber, Germany
 Wasilla, United States

Ueda

 Broomfield, United States
 Davos, Switzerland
 Jōetsu, Japan
 Kamakura, Japan
 Kudoyama, Japan
 Toyooka, Japan

Uji

 Kamloops, Canada
 Nuwara Eliya, Sri Lanka
 Xianyang, China

Unzen
 Gurye, South Korea

Urasoe
 Quanzhou, China

Urayasu
 Orlando, United States

Ushiku

 Greve in Chianti, Italy
 Hitachiōta, Japan
 Orange, Australia
 Shikama, Japan
 Whitehorse, Canada

Utsunomiya

 Auckland, New Zealand
 Orléans, France
 Qiqihar, China
 Tulsa, United States

Uwajima

 Honolulu, United States
 Ōsaki, Japan
 Xiangshan, China

W
Wakayama

 Bakersfield, United States
 Jeju City, South Korea
 Jinan, China
 Richmond, Canada

Wakō
 Longview, United States

Warabi
 El Dorado County, United States

Y
Yachiyo
 Tyler, United States

Yaizu
 Hobart, Australia

Yamagata

 Boulder, United States
 Jilin City, China
 Kitzbühel, Austria
 Swan Hill, Australia
 Ulan-Ude, Russia

Yamaguchi

 Changwon, South Korea
 Gongju, South Korea
 Jinan, China
 Pamplona, Spain

Yamato
 Gwangmyeong, South Korea

Yao
 Bellevue, United States

Yatsushiro

 Beihai, China
 Keelung, Taiwan

Yawata

 Baoji, China
 Milan, United States

Yoichi
 East Dunbartonshire, Scotland, United Kingdom

Yokkaichi

 Long Beach, United States
 Tianjin, China

Yokohama

 Constanţa, Romania
 Lyon, France
 Manila, Philippines
 Mumbai, India
 Odesa, Ukraine
 San Diego, United States
 Shanghai, China
 Vancouver, Canada

Yokosuka

 Brest, France
 Corpus Christi, United States
 Fremantle, Australia
 Medway, England, United Kingdom

Yonago

 Baoding, China
 Sokcho, South Korea

Yoshikawa
 Lake Oswego, United States

Yotsukaidō
 Livermore, United States

Yugawara

 Chungju, South Korea
 Port Stephens, Australia

Z
Zama
 Smyrna, United States

References

Japan
Sister cities
Sister cities
Foreign relations of Japan
Populated places in Japan